Niendorf may refer to the following places in Germany:

Niendorf, Brandenburg, a part of Ihlow, Brandenburg.
Niendorf, Hamburg, a quarter of Hamburg 
a part of Bienenbüttel, Lower Saxony
Niendorf, Mecklenburg-Vorpommern, in the Nordwestmecklenburg district, Mecklenburg-Vorpommern
a part of Grebs-Niendorf in the Ludwigslust district, Mecklenburg-Vorpommern
Groß Niendorf, Mecklenburg-Vorpommern, in the district of Parchim, Mecklenburg-Vorpommern
Niendorf, Saxony-Anhalt, a part of Oebisfelde-Weferlingen, Saxony-Anhalt
Niendorf bei Berkenthin, in the Herzogtum Lauenburg district, Schleswig-Holstein
Niendorf an der Stecknitz, in the Herzogtum Lauenburg district, Schleswig-Holstein
Niendorf auf Fehmarn, a part of Fehmarn, in the Ostholstein district, Schleswig-Holstein,
, a part of Timmendorfer Strand, in the Ostholstein district, Schleswig-Holstein
Groß Niendorf, Schleswig-Holstein, in the district of Segeberg, Schleswig-Holstein